HMS Hedingham Castle was a  of the Royal Navy named after Hedingham Castle in Essex.

She was originally to have been called Gorey Castle (after Mont Orgueil in Jersey). She was launched at John Crown & Sons Ltd in Sunderland on 30 October 1944. In World War II she served as a convoy escort.

In 1953 she took part in the Fleet Review to celebrate the Coronation of Queen Elizabeth II and was broken up at Granton in April 1958.

Another Castle-class corvette was originally to have been called Hedingham Castle but she was reallocated to the Royal Canadian Navy before launching and renamed .

She plays in the film Seagulls Over Sorrento (also called Crest of the Wave) (Roy Boulting – 1954).

References

Publications

 

Castle-class corvettes
1944 ships